The New Jersey Performing Arts Center (NJPAC), in Downtown Newark in Newark, New Jersey, is one of the largest performing arts centers in the United States.  Home to the New Jersey Symphony Orchestra (NJSO), more than nine million visitors (including more than one million children) have visited the center since it opened in October 1997 on the site of the former Military Park Hotel.

NJPAC has been an important component in revitalization of New Jersey's largest city. Located just west of the Passaic River waterfront, the Center lies in the heart of the city's cultural district around Military Park and Washington Park that also includes   The Newark Museum, New Jersey Historical Society, and the Newark Public Library. The Prudential Center is just to the south.

Philip S. Thomas was named Vice President of Arts Education in 1992. NJPAC has one of the largest arts education programs offered by a performing arts center in the nation.  The program includes arts training classes, scholarships, in-school residencies, professional development,  and family and children's programming, allowing students, teachers and families to interact with professional artists and explore the various genres of music, theater, dance, poetry and more.

Performance halls and other facilities 
 Prudential Hall, a 2800-seat hall arranged in four horseshoe-shaped tiers, with boxes and orchestra seating. It is typically used for opera, ballet, symphony orchestra, and Broadway series performances. During ensemble performances, concert towers are positioned on the stage. During opera/dance performances, these towers can be removed to allow for more space on stage. At this hall, the orchestra pit can serve as a stage extension or become an additional seating area, if the need arises.
 Victoria Theatre, a 514-seat theater equipped with orchestra-level and single balcony seating. It is typically used for theatrical production, chamber recital, contemporary dance, jazz, popular music concerts and experimental theater performances. The theater is capable of reducing sound reverberance level with its extendable acoustic curtains.
 The Chase Room, with 350 seats, is home to center's cabaret performance series, bi-annual hip hop festival, and spoken word series.
 Horizon Theater, an 88-seat black box theater

History 
The State of New Jersey decided to build a world class performing arts center in 1986, when then Governor of New Jersey Thomas Kean appointed a committee to decide the location and the needs of New Jersey's performing arts organization. They chose Newark over other cities because of the density of the surrounding areas, proximity to New York City, highway and rail access to the site, and a location inside a city in need of revitalization. The last reason was considered especially important. A major goal of NJPAC was to help revitalize the city, bringing people back into blighted areas and provide jobs.
The planning commission decided that the new center would be directly integrated into the city, encouraged walking, and provided a plaza for the city. Previous redevelopment schemes in Newark, such as the Gateway Center had all involved skyways that connected all the main office buildings to Newark Penn Station above street level, further segregating the city. The master plan, executed by Skidmore, Owings and Merrill consisted of plazas and pedestrian boulevards, joining major thoroughfares.

After a selection process, the board chose Barton Myers as the lead architect, based on his experience with theaters and his contextual buildings. They instructed him to build a complex that was the opposite of the Kennedy Center or Lincoln Center, and more like the Pittsburgh Cultural Trust. Instead of a monument to the arts, Myers saw it as another part of the city tying it to residents and inviting them into it. He related the physical structure to the context by using brick, exposed steel, and glass as the materials, to reflect the industrial roots of Newark. Gail L. Thompson was named the Vice President of Design and Construction in 1990.

Groundbreaking ceremonies took place in October 1993 with speeches by dignitaries and performances by Kathleen Battle and the Newark Boys Chorus, among others. During the bidding process, NJPAC President & CEO Lawrence Goldman mandated that most of the construction jobs had to go to local minorities. The board of the organization successfully implemented this program, suspending a contractor in 1995 for failing to do so.

Construction began in 1995 and was completed in 1997, receiving rave reviews by The New York Times architecture critic Herbert Muschamp upon its opening. The New Yorker  has said that it houses one of the best modern concert halls on the Eastern Seaboard - handsome in appearance, warm in sound.

First Landing Party of the Founders of Newark is one of four public art works  created by Gutzon Borglum that are located in Newark (the others being Seated Lincoln (1911), Indian and the Puritan (1916), Wars of America (1926)). The four pieces were added to the New Jersey Register of Historic Places on September 13, 1994, and the National Register of Historic Places on October 28, 1994. It was restored to the grounds on NJPAC in 2016.

Programming
Stephanie Hughley was named the Vice President of Programming in 1995. Since opening, artists and celebrities that have appeared on NJPAC's stages include the Boston Symphony Orchestra; Yo-Yo Ma, Paul Simon, Bob Dylan, Diana Krall, Alvin Ailey American Dance Theater, Chicago Symphony Orchestra, Twyla Tharp Dance, Dance Theatre of Harlem, singer Ronnie Spector (the Hard Hat show for construction workers and their families, before the venue's official fall of 1997 opening), Dire Straits, Israel Philharmonic, Nancy Wilson and Ramsey Lewis, Royal Danish Ballet, Hilary Hahn, Bill T. Jones, Itzhak Perlman, Sting, Les Ballets Trockadero de Monte Carlo, Elvis Costello, King Crimson, Yes, Jethro Tull, the National Song & Dance Company of Mozambique, the Afro-Cuban All-Stars, Audra McDonald, the Buena Vista Social Club, The Chieftains, Dulce Pontes, Alice Coltrane, David Cassidy, Salt-N-Pepa, Gilberto Santa Rosa, Jerry Seinfeld, Kevin Hart, Christine Ebersole, Jennifer Hudson, Herbie Hancock, Sweet Honey in the Rock, Garrison Keillor, Maurizio Pollini, Gewandhaus Orchestra, Balé Folclorico da Bahia, Peter, Paul & Mary, Savion Glover, Aspen Santa Fe Ballet, Art Garfunkel, Kodo Drummers, Kirov Orchestra, Frankie Valli, Martha Graham Dance, Johnny Mathis, New Edition, Angelique Kidjo, Renee Fleming, Evgeny Kissin, Adam Sandler, Chiara Taigi and Dream Theater.

A regular season is presented by the New Jersey Symphony Orchestra.

NJPAC has attracted over 9 million patrons (including 1 million children) since its October 18, 1997 Opening Night.

In 2001 NJPAC was awarded the Rudy Bruner Award for Urban Excellence silver medal.

In 2011, John Schreiber replaced Lawrence P. Goldman as President/CEO of the center, .

In October 2017, NJPAC unveiled a strategic partnership with Madison Marquette, a real estate developer working on Asbury Park's artistic renaissance. As part of the partnership, NJPAC will produce live performances, arts education and community engagement events in Asbury Park. There will also be events at Asbury Park Boadwalk's 3,600-person Convention Hall and 1,600-seat Paramount Theatre.
4

In addition to the many well known programs like Shen Yun and The Piano Guys concert, there are also free events that occur all the time. For instance there are dance workshops for all levels and ages, and even concerts by known musicians like Roni Ben-Hur.

Festivals and special events
The 2010, Geraldine R. Dodge Poetry Festival took place in Newark for the first time, with NJPAC hosting the festivals and many of its events. The festival returned in 2012.
The Newark Peace Education Summit, attended by the 14th Dalai Lama (aka Tenzin Gyatso) and other dignitaries, guest took place in May 2011. NJPAC hosted the seventh season of the reality show competition America's Got Talent. In October 2012, the Arts Center inaugurated the TD James Moody Democracy of Jazz Festival, Newark's first major jazz festival in 15 years, in tribute to Newark native James Moody (saxophonist).  Each summer for the past 16 years, the Arts Center has also hosted a free, outdoor music festival, entitled Horizon Foundation Sounds of the city, the free concerts take place in NJPAC's Theater Square each Thursday night in July and August.

NJPAC partnered with Fairleigh Dickinson University for a special program called the, "New Jersey Speaker Series." This annual event will be in its fifth year after its 2018-2019 line-up. Many notable speakers come together in this event including 42nd President of the United States, Bill Clinton, and former Prime Minister of the United Kingdom, David Cameron.

NJPAC's Center for Arts Education
NJPAC's Center for Arts Education, where many of the classrooms and offices for the center's arts education department reside, is situated adjacent to the center on nearby Rector St. After undergoing "adaptive reuse" renovations in Spring 2001, the building houses classes and staff year round. The facility includes a theater, two dance studios, seven classrooms, nine practice rooms, and office space.

Women's Association of NJPAC 
The Women's Association of NJPAC (WA) was formed back in 1994, prior to the opening of the building itself. The WA was founded by Joan Budd, Patti Chambers, Sally Chubb, Ronnie Goldberg, Sheila Labrecque, Gabriella Morris, Pat Ryan, Phyllis Cerf Wagner, and, Diana Vagelos. Through their efforts, the association has successfully raised over $50 million for NJPAC and the aforementioned Center for Arts Education.  They currently have approximately 2000 members and are looking for more members that are willing to contribute to the Newark culture and have a love for the arts. The WA fundraises through many different events such as the Spotlight Gala and the annual Spring Luncheon and Auction.

One Theater Square

Transportation 
Newark Light Rail service opened as July 17, 2006, at the NJPAC/Center Street station, connecting the site with Broad Street Station and Penn Station Newark.

Lionsgate Newark
In 2022, NJPAC partnered with Great Point Studios to announce a major new film and television production studio overlooking Weequahic Park and Weequahic Golf Course, to be called "Lionsgate Newark." The studio open in 2024 on the 15-acre former Seth Boyden housing projects site at 101 Center Terrace in the Dayton section of the city near Evergreen Cemetery. Lionsgate Newark with be owned and operated by Great Point Studios and will partner with NJPAC on public relations and community affairs with NJPAC.

North to Shore Festival

In 2023, NJPAC announced it would be producing the inaugural North to Shore festival.

See also 

 Robert Treat Center
 Newark Symphony Hall
 Firemen's Insurance Company's Home Office Building
 Critical Regionalism, the style of architecture. 
 List of concert halls
 Trilogy: An Opera Company

References

External links 
 New Jersey Performing Arts Center Official Website
 Barton Myers Associates
 Charity Navigator
Bruner Award 2001

Theatres in New Jersey
Concert halls in New Jersey
Event venues established in 1997
1997 establishments in New Jersey
Buildings and structures in Newark, New Jersey
Culture of Newark, New Jersey
Performing arts centers in New Jersey
Barton Myers buildings
Tourist attractions in Newark, New Jersey